The National Multicultural Greek Council (NMGC) is an umbrella council for eleven multicultural fraternities and sororities (Greek Letter Organizations (GLOs)) in the United States. It was established in 1998.

Affiliate organizations
Organizations noted in alphabetical order. Chapter counts include graduate chapters and colonies.

Current Members

Former members

Chapter Advisor award
The Council gives the Chapter Advisor of the Year award to a selected fraternity or sorority chapter advisor. The 2014 award went to Xong Lor of the University of Arkansas.

See also
List of social fraternities and sororities
Racism in Greek life

References

External links
 Official website

 
Student societies in the United States
1998 establishments in the United States
Organizations established in 1998
Multiculturalism in the United States
Greek letter umbrella organizations